{{DISPLAYTITLE:List of Astragalus species}}

This is a list of Astragalus species, including infraspecific taxa. They are listed according to subgenera (for Old World species) or informal groups called phalanxes (for North American species). Subgenera and phalanxes are further subdivided into sections. Phylogenetic analyses have determined that many of these subgenera, phalanxes, and sections are not monophyletic.

Old World Astragalus

Subgenus Calycocystis Bge.

Section Asciocalyx Astragalus asciocalyx Bunge

Section Chaetodon Bge.

Section Cysticalyx Bge.Astragalus cysticalyx Ledeb.

Section Cystodes Bge.

Section Eustales Bge.

Section Hysophilus Bge.

Section Laguropsis Bge.Astragalus subsecundus Boiss.

Section Macrocystodes M. Pop.Astragalus pseudorhacodes Contsch.

Section Macrocystis M. Pop.

Subgenus Calycophysa Bge.

Section Acidodes Astragalus macrosemius Boiss. & Hohen.Astragalus sahendi Buhse

Section Alopecias (Stev.) Bge.Astragalus alopecias Pallas

Section Alopeciodes Gontsch.

Section Alopecuroidei Astragalus jessenii BungeAstragalus kirrindicus Boiss.Astragalus obtusifolius DC.

Section Anthylloidei Astragalus eriostomus Bornm.Astragalus khoshjailensis Sirj. & Rech. f.Astragalus murinus Boiss.Astragalus submitis Boiss. & Hohen.

Section Campylanthus Astragalus campylanthus Boiss.

Section Eremophysa Bge.Astragalus chiwensis Bunge

Section Eremophysopsis Gontsch.

Section Grammocalyx Bge.Astragalus grammocalyx Boiss. & Hohen.

Section Halicaeabus Bge.

Section Hymenostegis Bge.Astragalus chrysostachys Boiss.Astragalus lagopoides Lam.Astragalus laguriformis Freyn.Astragalus straussii Bornm.

Section Laxiflori Astragalus dictyolobus BungeAstragalus tawilicus Townsend

Section Megalocystis Bge.

Section Microphysa Bge.Astragalus cephalanthus DC.

Section Poterion Astragalus fasciculifolius Boiss.Astragalus glaucacanthos Fischer

Section Tricholobus Bge.Astragalus magistratus Maass. et al.Astragalus tricholobus DC.
ssp. tricholobus Tietz

Subgenus Caprinus Bge.

Section Acanathophace Bge.

Section Aegacantha Bge.

Section Albertoregelia M. Pop.

Section Astenolobium  (Nevski) Gontsch.

Section Bungeastrum Gontsch.

Section Campanella Gontsch.

Section Cartilaginella Gontsch.

Section Christianopsis Gontsch.

Section Chronopus Bge.Astragalus dactylocarpus Boiss.Astragalus jesdianus Boiss. & BuhseAstragalus vanillae Boiss.

Section Erionotus Bge.

Section Lithoon  (Nevski) Gontsch.

Section Macrocarpon Gontsch.

Section Macrosemium Bge.Astragalus paradoxus Bunge

Section Mesocarpon Gontsch.

Section Myobroma  (Stev.) Bge.Astragalus ischredensis Bge.Astragalus lambinonii Podl.Astragalus lobophorus Boiss.Astragalus monanthemus Boiss.Astragalus siliquosus Boiss.
ssp. lobophorus 
ssp. siliquosus 

Section Pendulina Gontsch.

Section Phacodes Bge.

Subgenus Cercidothrix Bge.

Section Acantherioceras Bge.Astragalus acantherioceras Rech. f. & Hausskn.

Section Acmothrix Bge.Astragalus fragrans Willd.

Section Ammodytes  (Stev.) Bge.

Section Ammodendron Bge.Astragalus macrobotrys BungeAstragalus squarrosus Bunge

Section Ammotrophus Bge.

Section Bulimiodes Bge.

Section Caraganella Astragalus stocksii Bunge

Section Chlorosphaerus Bge.

Section Chomutoviana B. Fedtsch.

Section Corethrum Bge.

Section Craccina  (Stev.) Bge.

Section Cremoceras Astragalus ochreatus Bunge

Section Cystium Bge.Astragalus masanderanus Bunge

Section Cytisodes Bge.Astragalus gigantirostratus Maassoumi et al.Astragalus stenocarpus Gontsch.

Section Erioceras Bge.Astragalus anacamptus Bunge

Section Euodmus Bge.

Section Helmia Bge.

Section Hololeuce Bge.Astragalus alyssoides Lam.

Section Incani Astragalus campylosema Boiss.Astragalus incanus 
ssp. incanus 
ssp. macrorhizus Astragalus latifolius Lam.Astragalus robustus Bunge

Section Irinaea Boiss.

Section Leucocercis Astragalus curviflorus Boiss.Astragalus mucronifolius Boiss.

Section Leucophysa Bge.

Section Melanocercis Bge.

Section Myobromopsis Boriss.

Section Onobrychoidei Astragalus cancellatus BungeAstragalus teheranicus Boiss.

Section Onobrychium Bge.Astragalus chaborasicus Boiss. et Hausskn.Astragalus goktschaicus Grossh.Astragalus mossulensis Bge.

Section Ornithopodium Bge.Astragalus ornithopodioides Lam.Astragalus shelkovnikovii Grossh.

Section Paracystium Gontsch.

Section Pedina  (Stev.) Bge.

Section Picrophace Bge.

Section Popovianthe Gontsch.

Section Proselius  (Stev.) Bge.Astragalus taschkendicus Bge.

Section Pseudoammotrophus Gontsch.

Section Tamias Bge.

Section Tanytrix Bge.

Section Trachyceris Bge.Astragalus dolichophyllus PallasAstragalus scaberrimus Bunge

Section Tropidolobus Gontsch.

Section Xiphidium Bge.Astragalus xiphidioides Freyn &Sint.

Subgenus Epiglottis Boiss.

Section Buceras DC.Astragalus hamosus L.

Section Edodimus Astragalus cymbicarpos Brot.

Section Epiglottis Bge.Astragalus edulis Durieu ex Bge.Astragalus epiglottis L.

Section Herpocaulos Bge.Astragalus vogelii (Webb.) Bornm.

Subgenus Hypoglottis Bge.

Section Eu-Hypoglottis Bge.

Section Malacothrix Bge.Astragalus deickianus Bornm.Astragalus eriopodus Boiss.Astragalus heterodoxus BungeAstragalus holopsilus BungeAstragalus macrostachys DC.Astragalus pulchellus Boiss.Astragalus sulukensis Freyn & Sint.

Section Plagiophaca Astragalus coelicolor Sirj. & Rech. f.

Section Poliothrix Bge.

Section Stereothrix Bge.Astragalus capito Boiss.Astragalus ledinghamii Barneby

Subgenus Phaca (L.) Bge.

Section Acanthophace Bge.Astragalus hemsleyi Aitch. & BakerAstragalus horridus Boiss.Astragalus schistocalyx Bunge

Section Astragalus L.Astragalus alpinus L.
ssp. alaskanus 
ssp. alpinus 
ssp. arcticus 
var. brunetianus Astragalus basineri Trautv.Astragalus caraganae Fisch. & Mey.Astragalus leptaleus A. GrayAstragalus retamocarpus Boiss. & Hohen.

Section Brachycarpus Boriss.Astragalus melanostachys Benth. ex Bunge

Section Caprini Astragalus aegobromus Boiss. & Hohen.Astragalus caprinus 
ssp. caprinus 
ssp. lanigerus Astragalus citrinus Bunge
ssp. barrowianus 
ssp. citrinus Astragalus curvipes Trautv.Astragalus multijugus DC.Astragalus nephtonensis FreynAstragalus urmiensis BungeAstragalus vereskensis Maassoumi & Podl.Astragalus vulcanicus Bornm.

Section Cenantrum KochAstragalus propinquus B. Schischk.

Section Coluteocarpus Boiss.

Section Diplotheca Hochst.

Section Erophaca  (Boiss.) Boiss.

Section Galegiformis Gontsch.

Section Glycyphyllos  (Stev.) Bge.Astragalus glycyphyllos L.

Section Hemiphaca Bge.Astragalus daenensis Boiss.Astragalus hemiphaca 

Section Hemiphragmium KochAstragalus australis (L.) Lam.
var. arboriginum (Richardson) Welsh
var. australis (L.) Lam.
var. glaberrimus Lam.
ssp. major 
ssp. olympicus 

Section Komaroviella Gontsch.

Section Lamprocarpa Astragalus lamprocarpus Maassoumi

Section Lithophilus Bge.

Section Macropodium O. et B. Fedtsch.

Section Melilotopsis Gontsch.

Section Nueuliella Gontsch.

Section Orobella Gontsch.Astragalus brachytropis (Stev.) C. A. M.

Section Pelta Astragalus peltatus Podl. & Deml.

Section Pendulina Astragalus dieterlei Podl.

Section Polycladi Astragalus polycladus Bureau & Franchet

Section Rhodophaca Boiss.

Section Scheremeteviana O. et B. Fedtsch.

Section Sesbanella Bge.

Section Stipitella G. Grig.

Section Tapinodes Bge.

Section Theiochrus Bge.

Section Vesicularia Gontsch.

Subgenus Pogonophace Bge.

Section Chlorostachys Bge.Astragalus atropilosulus (Hochst.) Bunge
ssp. atropilosulus  
ssp. burkeanus  
var. venosus (Hochst.) GillettAstragalus chinensis L.

Section Lotidium Bge.Astragalus nankotaizanensis SasakiAstragalus sinicus L.—Chinese milkvetch, zi yun ying (紫雲英)

Section Phyllolobium  (Fisch.) Bge.Astragalus complanatus R. Br.
var. complanatus 
var. eutrichus 

Subgenus Tragacantha Bge.

Section Brachycalyx Bge.Astragalus brachycalyx FischerAstragalus caspicus M. Bieb.

Section Hystrix Astragalus hystrix Bunge

Section Macrophyllium Boiss.Astragalus oleifolius DC.

Section Oliganthos Boriss.

Section Platonychium Bge.Astragalus verus Olivier

Section Polyanthos Boriss.Astragalus cerasocrenus Bunge

Section Polystegis Astragalus piptocephalus Boiss.

Section Pterophorus Bge.

Section Rhacophorus Bge.Astragalus peristerus Boiss. & Hausskn.Astragalus rhodosemius FischerAstragalus stenolepis FischerAstragalus trachyacanthos Boiss. & Hausskn.

Section Stenonychium Bge.

Section Tragacantha Bge.Astragalus echidnaeformis Sirj.

Subgenus Trimeniaeus Bge.

Section Ankylotus (Stev.) Bge.Astragalus commixtus Bunge

Section Annulares Astragalus annularis ForsskalAstragalus arpilobus Kar. & Kir.Astragalus campylorrhynchus FischerAstragalus crenatus SchultesAstragalus eremophilus Boiss.Astragalus corrugatus Bertol.

Section Aulacolobus Bge.

Section Biserrula Astragalus pelecinus (L.) Barneby

Section Campylotrichon Gontsch.

Section Cyamodes Bge.Astragalus boeticus L.

Section Cycloglottis Bge.

Section Dipelta  (Rgl. et Schmalh.) Bge.Astragalus dipelta Bunge

Section Drepanodes Bge.

Section Eodimus 

Section Haematodes Bge.

Section Harpilobus Bge.

Section Heterodontus Bge.Astragalus guttatus Banks & Soland

Section Hispiduli Astragalus bakaliensis Bge.Astragalus duplostrigosus Post & BeauverdAstragalus hispidulus 

Section Mirae Astragalus migpo R. Kam.

Section Ophiocarpus Bge.Astragalus aitchisonii Bunge

Section Oxyglottis Bge.Astragalus asterias Stev. ex Ledeb.Astragalus biserrula BungeAstragalus oxyglottis Bieb.
var. oxyglottis 
var. psiloglottis Astragalus schmalhausensii BungeAstragalus tribuloides Del.
var. leiocarpus 
var. kirghisicus 

Section Pentaglottis Bge.Astragalus echinatus Murray

Section Platyglottis Bge.Astragalus bombycinus Boiss.Astragalus camptoceras Bunge

Section Poterion Bge.Astragalus armatus  Willd.
Astragalus armatus ssp armatus
Astragalus armatus ssp numidicus

Section Sesamei DC.Astragalus asterias Hohen.Astragalus coronilla BungeAstragalus filicaulis Kar. & Kir.Astragalus persepolitanus Boiss.Astragalus sesamoides Boiss.

Section Sewerzowia Bge.Astragalus vicarius Lipsky

Section Thlaspidium Lipsky

Incertae sedisAstragalus abyssinicus Astragalus acaulis Astragalus acinaciferus Astragalus ackerbergensis Astragalus acmophylloides Grossh.Astragalus adscendens Astragalus affghanus Astragalus aintabicus Astragalus aksuensis Astragalus albanicus Grossh.Astragalus alexandri Astragalus alexandrinus Astragalus alopecuroides L.Astragalus alopecurus Astragalus altaicus Astragalus amalecitanus Astragalus ampherstianus Astragalus ammodendron BungeAstragalus andreji Astragalus angustiflorus 
ssp. angustiflorus Astragalus angustifolius 
ssp. angustifolius 
ssp. pungens Astragalus anserinaefolius Astragalus antiochianus Astragalus apollineus Astragalus aquilanus Astragalus aranatus Astragalus arcuatus Astragalus arenarius L.Astragalus arguricus Astragalus aristatus Astragalus armeniacus Astragalus arnacantha Astragalus arnacanthoides Astragalus asper Astragalus aspindzicus Manden. & Chinth.Astragalus atenicus Ivan.Astragalus aureus Astragalus austriacus Astragalus austrosachalinensis Astragalus avicennus Astragalus bachtiaricus Astragalus bakeri Astragalus baldaccii Astragalus balearicus Chater—Balearic milkvetchAstragalus basilicus Astragalus basineri Astragalus bicuspis Fisch.Astragalus bifidus Turcz.Astragalus borissovae Astragalus bornemullerianus Astragalus brachycarpus Astragalus brachylobus Astragalus brachyodontus Astragalus brachypus Astragalus brachystachys Astragalus brevidens Astragalus bubaloceras Astragalus bungeanus Astragalus bungei Astragalus burkeanus Astragalus bylowae ElenevskyAstragalus calabrus Astragalus callainus Astragalus calycinus Astragalus campylotrichus Astragalus candidissimus Astragalus candolleanus Astragalus captiosus Astragalus cartilagineus Astragalus caryolobus Astragalus caucasicus Astragalus centralpinus Astragalus chivensis Astragalus chlorostachys Astragalus chorinensis BungeAstragalus ciceroides Astragalus circassicus Astragalus clussii Astragalus coarctatus Trautv.Astragalus coelestis Boiss.Astragalus cognatus Astragalus coluteocarpus 
var. glaber 
var. coluteocarpus Astragalus coluteoides Astragalus combellatus Astragalus condensatus Astragalus conspicuus Astragalus contortuplicatus Astragalus cornutus Astragalus cottonianus Astragalus cretaceus Astragalus creticus 
ssp. creticus Astragalus cruciatus 
ssp. cruciatus 
ssp. garamantum Astragalus cyri FominAstragalus dahuricus Astragalus danicus Retz.Astragalus dasyanthus Astragalus davuricus Astragalus delbesii Astragalus demetri Astragalus densiflorus Astragalus denudatus Astragalus depressus Astragalus discolor Astragalus drusorum 
var. drusorum 
var. maconiticus Astragalus echinus DC.Astragalus edmonstonei Astragalus ehrenbergii BungeAstragalus emarginatus Astragalus epiglottis 
ssp. asperulus 
ssp. epiglottis Astragalus eremospartoides Astragalus eriophylloides Astragalus eriophyllus Astragalus ernestii Astragalus eryophyllus Astragalus eriopodus Astragalus eugenii Astragalus exscapus Astragalus eximius Astragalus expansus Astragalus falciformis Astragalus falconeri Astragalus fatmensis Astragalus finitimus Astragalus flavescens Astragalus flexus Astragalus floridus Astragalus fragiferus Astragalus frickii Astragalus frigidus Bge.—American milkvetch, arctic milkvetchAstragalus frigidus GrayAstragalus fruticosus Astragalus fuhsii Freyn & Sint.Astragalus galega Astragalus galegiformis Astragalus gaspensis Astragalus gjunaicus Grossh.Astragalus glaucanthus Fischer and Mey.Astragalus glaux Astragalus globiceps Astragalus gombiformis Astragalus gorczakovskii L.I. VassiljevaAstragalus gorodkovii Astragalus grahamianus Astragalus granatensis 
ssp. granatensis 
Astragalus graveolens 
Astragalus grossii 
Astragalus grubovii 
Astragalus gryphus 
Astragalus gummifer 
Astragalus gymnopodus 
Astragalus gyzensis 
Astragalus haestiabundus 
Astragalus hajastanus 
Astragalus heterodontus 
Astragalus himalayanus 
Astragalus hirsutissimus 
Astragalus hispanicus 
Astragalus hissaricus 
Astragalus hoantchy 
Astragalus hoffmeisteri 
var. hoffmeisteri 
Astragalus hohenackeri 
Astragalus hololeios 
Astragalus huetii 
Astragalus humilis 
Astragalus hyrcanus Pall.
Astragalus ibincinus 
Astragalus iliensis 
Astragalus illyricus —Illirian milkvetch
Astragalus inaequalifolius 
Astragalus incertus 
Astragalus inopinatus 
ssp. inopinatus 
ssp. oreogenus 
ssp. pseudoadsurgens 
Astragalus inquilinus 
Astragalus interpositus 
Astragalus iskanderi 
Astragalus japonicus 
Astragalus junatovii 
Astragalus kadshorensis 
Astragalus kahiricus 
Astragalus karakugensis 
Astragalus karamasicus 
Astragalus kaufmannii 
Astragalus kaugmanii 
ssp. atratus 
ssp. kaugmanii 
Astragalus kazbeki 
Astragalus khasianus 
Astragalus kialensis 
Astragalus kirpicznikovii 
Astragalus kolymensis 
Astragalus kopetdaghi 
Astragalus kozlovskyi 
Astragalus kurdaicus Sumnev.
Astragalus kurdicus Boiss.
Astragalus kurtschumensis 
Astragalus lacteus 
Astragalus laetus 
Astragalus laguroides Pall.
Astragalus lanuginosus 
Astragalus lasioglottis 
Astragalus lasiophyllus Ledeb.
Astragalus lasiosemius 
Astragalus lepagei 
Astragalus leontinus Wulfen
Astragalus leucacanthus 
Astragalus leucocephalus 
Astragalus levieri 
Astragalus lioui 
Astragalus lithophilus 
Astragalus litvinovii 
Astragalus longiflorus 
Astragalus longipetalus 
Astragalus longipetiolatus 
Astragalus lovensis 
Astragalus lusitanicus 
ssp. lusitanicus 
Astragalus lycius 
Astragalus lydius 
Astragalus macrocephalus 
ssp. macrocephalus 
Astragalus macronyx 
Astragalus macropelmatus 
Astragalus macropterus DC.
Astragalus macrourus Fisch. & C.A. Mey.
Astragalus mahoschanicus 
Astragalus mareoticus 
var. handiensis 
var. mareoticus 
Astragalus marinus 
Astragalus maritimus 
Astragalus massiliensis 
ssp. massiliensis 
ssp. vicentinus 
Astragalus maximowiczii 
Astragalus maymanensis 
Astragalus megalotropis Bunge
Astragalus melilotoides Pall.
var. melilotoides 
var. tenuis  Turcz.
Astragalus mendax 
Astragalus mesogitanus 
Astragalus microcephalus 
Astragalus micropteris 
Astragalus microrchis 
Astragalus miniatus Bge.
Astragalus mollis 
var. iranicus 
var. mollis 
Astragalus mongholicus 
Astragalus monophyllus 
Astragalus monspessulanus 
ssp. monspessulanus 
var. vandasii 
Astragalus mukusiensis 
Astragalus munroi 
Astragalus nacropelmatus 
Astragalus nanus 
Astragalus nebrodensis 
Astragalus nigrescens 
Astragalus nigrimontanus 
Astragalus nishapurensis 
Astragalus nivalis 
Astragalus norvegicus 
Astragalus nudicarpus 
Astragalus nurensis 
Astragalus oldenburgii 
Astragalus oltensis Grossh.
Astragalus onobrychis L.
Astragalus ophiocarpus 
Astragalus oroboides 
Astragalus ovalis 
Astragalus ovinus 
Astragalus palmyrensis 
Astragalus parnassi 
Astragalus pastorius 
Astragalus paucijugus 
Astragalus peduncularis 
Astragalus pellitus 
Astragalus penduliflorus 
Astragalus peregrinus 
Astragalus peterfii 
Astragalus petunnikovii 
Astragalus physocalyx Fisch.
Astragalus physocarpus 
Astragalus physodes L.
Astragalus pinetorum 
ssp. declinatus 
ssp. pinetorum 
Astragalus piranshahricus 
Astragalus platyphyllus 
Astragalus platyraphis 
Astragalus plumosus 
var. akardaghicus 
var. plumosus Astragalus podocarpus Astragalus polyactinus Astragalus polyceras Astragalus polygala Astragalus ponticus Pall.Astragalus prusianus Astragalus przewalskii Astragalus pseudocytisoides Astragalus pseudogombo Astragalus pseudoindurascens Astragalus pseudotataricus Astragalus pseudoutriger Astragalus pseudovinus Astragalus psilophus Astragalus pterocephalus Astragalus ptilocephalus BakerAstragalus ptilodes Astragalus pulcher Astragalus raphaelis Astragalus rawlinsianus Astragalus reduncus Astragalus remotijugus Astragalus renzianus Astragalus rhizanthus 
ssp. candolleanus 
ssp. rhizanthus Astragalus richardsonii 
var. richardsonii 
var. secundum Astragalus rimarum Astragalus roemeri Astragalus ruprechtii Astragalus russelii Astragalus rytilobus Astragalus sachalinensis 
var. pubescens 
var. sachalinensis Astragalus salatavicus Astragalus saralensis Astragalus schahrudensis Astragalus schanginianus Astragalus schelichowii Astragalus scheremetevianus Astragalus schimperi 
var. schimperi 
var. subsessilis Astragalus schinanensis Astragalus schischkinii Astragalus schizopterus Astragalus schrenkianus Astragalus schugnanicus Astragalus scorpioides Astragalus scorpiurus 
var. scorpiurus Astragalus sealei Astragalus secundus Astragalus semilunatus Astragalus sempervirens 
var. catalaunicus 
ssp. cephalonicus 
ssp. muticus 
ssp. nevadensis 
ssp. sempervirens Astragalus sesameus Astragalus sevandensis Astragalus sevangensis Astragalus shagalensis Astragalus shinanensis Astragalus sibthorpianus Astragalus siculus Astragalus sieberi Astragalus sieversianus Astragalus sikkimensis Astragalus sinaicus Astragalus sirinicus 
ssp. sirinicus 
ssp. genargenteus Astragalus skorniakovii Astragalus sogotensis Astragalus solandri LoweAstragalus somalensis Astragalus spinosus —spiny locoweedAstragalus spruneri Astragalus stalinskyi Astragalus stella Astragalus stenanthus Astragalus stevenianus Astragalus stewartii Astragalus stipulatus Astragalus striatellus Astragalus strictus Astragalus subuliformis Astragalus sulcatus Astragalus sumbari Astragalus sunpanensis Astragalus takhtadzhjanii Astragalus tataricus M. B.Astragalus tatarius Franch.Astragalus tawalicus Astragalus taygeteus Astragalus tecti-mundi Astragalus tenuis Astragalus thracicus Astragalus tibetanus Astragalus tmoleus 
var. tmoleus 
var. bounacanthus Astragalus tolmaczevii Astragalus tongolensis Astragalus touranicus Astragalus transcaspicus Astragalus tragacanthoides 
ssp. pinetorum Astragalus transsilvanicus Astragalus tribulifolius Astragalus trigonus Astragalus trigonocarpus Astragalus troizkii Astragalus tschimganicus Astragalus tugarinovii Astragalus tumninensis Astragalus turbinatus Astragalus turcomanicus Astragalus turczaninovianus Astragalus turczaninovii Astragalus turkestanus Astragalus tuyehensis  Ghahr., Maassoumi & F. Ghahrem.Astragalus tymphaeus Astragalus ugamicus Astragalus unifoliatus Astragalus uninodus Astragalus uralensis Astragalus utriger Pall.Astragalus utriges Pall.Astragalus vallicola Astragalus variabilis Astragalus venosus Astragalus verrucosus Astragalus versicolor Pall.Astragalus vesicarius L.
ssp. albidus 
ssp. vesicarius (Pollini) Arcang.Astragalus viciifolius DC.Astragalus vulpinus Astragalus webbianus Astragalus wilmottianus Astragalus xanthomeloides Astragalus xipholobus Astragalus zanskarensis Astragalus zubairensis 

North American Astragalus

Ceridothrix Phalanx Barneby

Section Onobrychoidei DC.Astragalus adsurgens Pallas
ssp. adsurgens Pallas
ssp. robustior Hook.
ssp. tananaicus (Hult.) Barneby

Section Uliginosi GrayAstragalus canadensis L.
ssp. brevidens (Gand.) Barneby
ssp. canadensis L.
ssp. mortoni (Nutt.) Wats.Astragalus falcatus Lam.Astragalus odoratus Lam.Astragalus oreganus Nutt. ex T. & G.Astragalus uliginosus 

Homaloboid Phalanx Barneby

Section Albuli BarnebyAstragalus albulus Woot. & Standl.

Section Ampularii BarnebyAstragalus ampullarius Wats.

Section Atrati JonesAstragalus atratus Wats.—Owyhee mourning milkvetch
ssp. atratus Wats.
ssp. inseptus Barneby ap. Hitchc. et al.
ssp. mensanus Jones
ssp. owyheensis (Nels. & Macbr.) JonesAstragalus salmonis Jones

Section Bicristati BarnebyAstragalus bicristatus GrayAstragalus ertterae Barneby & ShevockAstragalus webberi Gray ap. Brew. & Wats.

Section Bisulcati GrayAstragalus bisulcatus (Hook.) Gray
ssp. bisulcatus (Hook.) Gray
ssp. haydenianus (Gray ex Brandegee) Barneby
ssp. major Welsh
ssp. nevadensis (Jones) BarnebyAstragalus racemosus Pursh
ssp. longisetus Jones
ssp. racemosus Pursh
ssp. treleasei C. L. Porter

Section Camptopodes BarnebyAstragalus camptopus Barneby

Section Collini JonesAstragalus collinus (Hook.) G. Don
ssp. collinus (Hook.) G. Don
ssp. laurentii (Rydb.) BarnebyAstragalus curvicarpus (A. Hell.) Macbr.
ssp. brachycodon (Barneby) Barneby
ssp. curvicarpus (A. Heller) Macbr.
ssp. subglaber (Rydb.) BarnebyAstragalus gibbsii Kellogg

Section Conjuncti BarnebyAstragalus conjunctus Wats.Astragalus hoodianus HowellAstragalus leibergi JonesAstragalus reventiformis (Rydb.) Barneby

Section CusickianiAstragalus californicus (Gray) GreeneAstragalus ceramicus Sheldon
ssp. apus Barneby
ssp. ceramicus Sheldon
ssp. filifolius (Gray) F. J. HermannAstragalus cusickii A. Gray
ssp. cusickii A. Gray
ssp. flexilipes Barneby
ssp. packardiae 
ssp. sterilis Astragalus filipes Torr. ex. GrayAstragalus inversus JonesAstragalus kerrii Knight et CullyAstragalus knightii BarnebyAstragalus sterilis BarnebyAstragalus whitneyi A. Gray
ssp. confusus Barneby
ssp. lenophyllus (Rydb.) Barneby
ssp. siskiyouensis (Rydb.) Barneby
ssp. sonneanus (Greene) Jeps.
ssp. whitneyi A. Gray

Section Drabellae (T. & G.) BarnebyAstragalus chloodes BarnebyAstragalus detritalis JonesAstragalus drabelliformis BarnebyAstragalus simplicifolius (Nutt.) GrayAstragalus spatulatus Sheldon—tufted milkvetch, Draba milkvetch

Section Drummondiani BarnebyAstragalus drummondii Dougl. ex. Hook.

Section Ervoidei BarnebyAstragalus bourgovii A. GrayAstragalus kentrophyta A. Gray
ssp. coloradoensis Jones
ssp. danaus (Barneby) Barneby
ssp. douglasii Barneby
ssp. elatus Wats.
ssp. implexus (Canby) Barneby
ssp. jessiae (Peck) Barneby
ssp. kentrophyta A. Gray
ssp. neomexicanus (Barneby) Barneby
ssp. tegetarius (S. Wats.) Dorn
ssp. ungulatus JonesAstragalus microcystis A. GrayAstragalus tenellus PurshAstragalus vexilliflexus 
ssp. nubilus Barneby
ssp. velliflexus Sheldon

Section Genistoidei (Torr. & Gray) BarnebyAstragalus convallarius Greene
ssp. convallarius Greene
ssp. finitimus Barneby
ssp. margaretae Barneby
ssp. scopulorum BarnebyAstragalus diversifolius A. GrayAstragalus miser Dougl. ex Hook.
ssp. crispatus (Jones) Cron.
ssp. decumbens (Nutt.) Cron.
ssp. hylophilus (Rydb.) Barneby
ssp. miser Dougl. ex Hook.
ssp. oblongifolius (Rydb.) Cron.
ssp. praeteritus Barneby
ssp. tenuifolius (Nutt.) Barneby
ssp. serotinus (Gray) Barneby

Section Gynophoraria (Rydb.) BarnebyAstragalus nutzotinensis Rouss.

Section Hesperonix (Rydb.) BarnebyAstragalus bolanderi Gray

Section Humistrati (Jones) BarnebyAstragalus anxius Meinke & KayeAstragalus chuskanus Barneby & SpellenbergAstragalus humistratus Gray
ssp. crispulus Barneby
ssp. hosackiae (Greene) Jones
ssp. humistratus Gray
ssp. humivagans (Rydb.) Barneby
ssp. sonorae (Gray) Jones
ssp. tenerrimus JonesAstragalus micromerius BarnebyAstragalus sesquiflorus Wats.Astragalus tegetarioides Jones

Section Inyoenses BarnebyAstragalus inyoensis Sheldon

Section Jaegeriani BarnebyAstragalus jaegerianus Munz

Section Jejuni (Jones) BarnebyAstragalus jejunis Wats.Astragalus limnocharis Barneby
ssp. limnocharis Barneby
ssp. montii (Welsh) Isely

Section Lonchocarpi GrayAstragalus aequalis ClokeyAstragalus atwoodii Welsh & ThorneAstragalus coltoni Jones
ssp. coltoni Jones
ssp. moabensis JonesAstragalus cronquistii BarnebyAstragalus duchesnenesis JonesAstragalus episcopus Wats.Astragalus hamiltonii PorterAstragalus harrisonii BarnebyAstragalus lancearius GrayAstragalus lonchocarpus Torr.Astragalus nidularius BarnebyAstragalus pinonis JonesAstragalus ripleyi BarnebyAstragalus schmollae PorterAstragalus titanophilus BarnebyAstragalus tortipes Anderson & J. M. PorterAstragalus xiphoides (Barneby) Barneby

Section Malaci BarnebyAstragalus chamaemeniscus BarnebyAstragalus cibarius Sheld.Astragalus cimae Jones
ssp. cimae Jones
ssp. sufflatus BarnebyAstragalus ensiformis JonesAstragalus malacoides BarnebyAstragalus malacus GrayAstragalus minthorniae (Rydb.) Jepson
ssp. gracilior (Barneby) Barneby
ssp. minthorniae (Rydb.) Jepson
ssp. villosus BarnebyAstragalus vallaris Jones

Section Michauxiani BarnebyAstragalus michauxii (O. Kze.) F. J. Hermann

Section Miselli (Rydb.) BarnebyAstragalus agnicidus BarnebyAstragalus arthuri JonesAstragalus carminis BarnebyAstragalus congdoni Wats.Astragalus ervoides H. & A.
ssp. ervoides H. & A.
ssp. maysillesii BarnebyAstragalus howelli GrayAstragalus misellus Wats.
ssp. misellus Wats.
ssp. pauper BarnebyAstragalus oniciformis BarnebyAstragalus paysonii (Rydb.) BarnebyAstragalus sinaloae BarnebyAstragalus straturensis JonesAstragalus toquimanus BarnebyAstragalus umbricatus Sheld.

Section Neglecti (Rydb.) BarnebyAstragalus neglectus (T. & G.) Sheld.

Section Neonix BarnebyAstragalus johannis-howellii BarnebyAstragalus mulfordae JonesAstragalus peckii PiperAstragalus yoder-williamsii Barneby

Section Neviniani BarnebyAstragalus nevinii GrayAstragalus traskiae Eastw.

Section Nudi BarnebyAstragalus serenoi (O. Kze.) Sheld.
ssp. serenoi (O. Kze.) Sheld.
ssp. shockleyi (Jones) Barneby
ssp. sordescens Barneby

Section Ocreati GrayAstragalus flavus Nutt. ex Torr. & Gray
ssp. argillosus (Jones) Barneby
ssp. candicans Gray
ssp. flavus Nutt. ex Torr. & GrayAstragalus moencoppensis JonesAstragalus sophoroides Jones

Section Oocalyces BarnebyAstragalus oocalycis Jones

Section Pachyphyllus JonesAstragalus asclepiadoides Jones

Section Pachypodes (Jones) BarnebyAstragalus pachypus Greene
ssp. jaegeri Munz
ssp. pachypus Greene

Section Pectinati GrayAstragalus grayi Parry ex Wats. ap. ParryAstragalus linifolius Osterh.Astragalus nelsonianus BarnebyAstragalus osterhouti JonesAstragalus pectinatus Dougl. ex G. DonAstragalus rafaelensis JonesAstragalus saurinus BarnebyAstragalus toanus Jones

Section Podosclerocarpi GrayAstragalus sclerocarpus Gray—sicklepod milkvetchAstragalus sinuatus PiperAstragalus speirocarpus Gray—coilpod locoweed

Section Polares (Rydb.) BarnebyAstragalus bodini Sheld.Astragalus lackschewitzii Lavin & MarriottAstragalus molybdenus BarnebyAstragalus polaris Benth. ex Hook.Astragalus shultziorum Barneby

Section Porrecti (Rydb.) BarnebyAstragalus porrectus Wats.

Section Preussiani JonesAstragalus beathii C. L. PorterAstragalus crotalariae (Bth.) GrayAstragalus debequaeus Welsh—Debeque milkvetchAstragalus eastwoodae JonesAstragalus iselyi WelshAstragalus mokiacensis GrayAstragalus pattersoni Gray ex Brand.Astragalus praelongus Sheld.
ssp. ellisiae (Rydb.) Barneby ap. B. L. Turner
ssp. lonchopus Barneby
ssp. praelongus Sheld.Astragalus preussii Gray
ssp. laxiflorus Gray
ssp. preussii GrayAstragalus sabulosus Jones

Section Pruniformes (Jones) BarnebyAstragalus accidens Wats.
ssp. accidens Wats.
ssp. hendersonii (Wats.) Jones

Section Quinqueflori BarnebyAstragalus brandegei T. C. PorterAstragalus quinqueflorus Wats.

Section Reventi–arrecti JonesAstragalus ackermanii BarnebyAstragalus adanus A. Nels.Astragalus arrectus GrayAstragalus atropubescens Coult. & Rish.Astragalus eremiticus Sheld.Astragalus obscurus Wats.Astragalus orcuttianus Wats.Astragalus remotus (Jones) BarnebyAstragalus reventus GrayAstragalus riparius BarnebyAstragalus scaphoides (Jones) Rydb.Astragalus sheldoni (Rydb.) BarnebyAstragalus terminalis Wats.

Section Scalares (Jones) BarnebyAstragalus scalaris Wats.

Section Scytocarpi GrayAstragalus castetteri BarnebyAstragalus coriaceus Hemsl.Astragalus flexuosus (Hook.) G. Don 
ssp. diehlii (Jones) Barneby
ssp. flexuosus (Hook.) G. Don
ssp. greenei (Gray) BarnebyAstragalus fucatus BarnebyAstragalus gracilis Nutt.Astragalus hallii A. Gray
ssp. fallax (Wats.) Barneby
ssp. hallii A. GrayAstragalus pictiformis BarnebyAstragalus proximus (Rydb.) Woot. & Standl.Astragalus puniceus Osterh
ssp. gertrudis (Greene) Barneby
ssp. puniceus Osterh.Astragalus shevockii BarnebyAstragalus subcinereus A. Gray
ssp. basalticus 
ssp. subcinereus A. GrayAstragalus wingatanus Wats.

Section Solitarii BarnebyAstragalus alvordensis JonesAstragalus applegatii PeckAstragalus solitarius Peck

Section Strigulosi JonesAstragalus altus Woot. & Standl.Astragalus cenorrhynchus BarnebyAstragalus cobrensis Gray
ssp. cobrensis Gray
ssp. fendleri 
ssp. maguirei KearneyAstragalus egglestonii (Rydb.) Kearn. & Peeb.Astragalus esperanzae JonesAstragalus guatemalensis Hemsl.
ssp. brevidentatus (Hemsl.) Barneby
ssp. guatemalensis Hemsl.
ssp. lozani JonesAstragalus hidalgensis (Rydb.) Barneby
ssp. hidalgensis (Rydb.) Barneby
ssp. protensus BarnebyAstragalus hintoni Barneby
ssp. cobrensis Barneby
ssp. hintoni BarnebyAstragalus jaliscensis (Rydb.) BarnebyAstragalus legionensis BarnebyAstragalus longissimus (Jones) BarnebyAstragalus lyonnetii BarnebyAstragalus micranthus Desv
ssp. micranthus Desv.
ssp. seatoni (Jones) BarnebyAstragalus microcymbus BarnebyAstragalus pennellianus BarnebyAstragalus potosinus BarnebyAstragalus pueblae JonesAstragalus purpusi JonesAstragalus radicans Humb. ex Hornem.
ssp. harshbergeri (Rydb.) Barneby
ssp. radicans Humb. ex Hornem.Astragalus recurvus GreeneAstragalus regiomontanus BarnebyAstragalus rusbyi GreeneAstragalus strigulosus KunthAstragalus tioides (Rydb.) BarnebyAstragalus tolucanus Robins. & Seat.Astragalus zacatecanus (Rydb.) Barneby

Section Tiopsidei BarnebyAstragalus scopulorum T. C Porter

Section Tweedyani BarnebyAstragalus tweedyi Canby

Section Woodruffiani BarnebyAstragalus woodruffi Jones

Hypoglottis Phalanx Barneby

Section Hypoglottoidei DC.Astragalus agrestis Dougl. ex G. DonAstragalus brachypetalus Trautv.Astragalus cicer L.Astragalus perplexus MaassoumiAstragalus pishchakensis Maassoumi

Orophaca Phalanx Barneby

Section Orophaca (Torr. & Gray) BarnebyAstragalus gilviflorus Sheld.—plains milkvetchAstragalus hyalinus JonesAstragalus proimanthus Barneby—precocious milkvetch

Section Sericoleuci BarnebyAstragalus aretioides (Jones) BarnebyAstragalus barrii BarnebyAstragalus sericoleucus GrayAstragalus tridactylicus Gray—foothill milkvetch

Phacoid Phalanx Barneby

Section Astragalus L.Astragalus alpinus L.
ssp. alpinus L.
ssp. brunetianus Fern.Astragalus leptaleus Gray

Section Hemiphaca K. & K.Astragalus williamsii Rydb.

Section Hemiphragmium (C. Koch) Bge.Astragalus cottoni Jones

Section Minerales BarnebyAstragalus molybdenus BarnebyAstragalus shultziorum Barneby

Section Oroboidei GrayAstragalus eucosmus RobinsonAstragalus robbinsii (Hook.) Barneby
ssp. alpiniformis (Rydb.) Barneby
ssp. fernaldi (Rydb.) Barneby
ssp. harringtonii (Rydb.) Barneby
ssp. jesupi Egglest. & Sheld.
ssp. minor (Hook.) Barneby
ssp. occidentalis Wats.
ssp. robbinsii (Oakes) A. Gray

Section Phaca (L.) HalaczyAstragalus americanus (Hook.) JonesAstragalus umbellatus Bge.

Piptoloboid Phalanx Barneby

Section Anemophili BarnebyAstragalus anemophilus GreeneAstragalus harbisonii BarnebyAstragalus miguelensis Greene

Section Argophylii GrayAstragalus accumbens Sheld.Astragalus amphioxys Gray
ssp. amphioxys Gray
ssp. modestus Barneby
ssp. vespertinus (Sheld.) JonesAstragalus anisus JonesAstragalus anserinus Atwood, Goodrich, & WelshAstragalus argophyllus Nutt. ex Torr. & Gray
ssp. argophyllus Nutt. ex Torr. & Gray
ssp. martini Jones
ssp. panguicensis (Jones) JonesAstragalus callithrix BarnebyAstragalus castaneiformis Wats.
ssp. castaneiformis Wats.
ssp. consobrinus BarnebyAstragalus chamaeleuce GrayAstragalus coccineus Brand.Astragalus columbianus BarnebyAstragalus consobrinus Astragalus cyaneus GrayAstragalus cymboides JonesAstragalus desereticus BarnebyAstragalus eurekensis JonesAstragalus eurylobus (Barneby) BarnebyAstragalus feënsis JonesAstragalus funereus JonesAstragalus henrimontanus WelshAstragalus holmgreniorum BarnebyAstragalus inflexus Dougl. ex Hook.Astragalus iodopetalus (Rydb.) BarnebyAstragalus loanus BarnebyAstragalus leucolobus Wats. ex JonesAstragalus marianus (Rydb.) BarnebyAstragalus missouriensis Nutt.
ssp. amphibolus Barneby
ssp. humistratus 
ssp. mimetes Barneby
ssp. missouriensis Nutt.Astragalus musimonum BarnebyAstragalus musiniensis JonesAstragalus neomexicanus Woot. & Standl.Astragalus newberryi Gray
ssp. aquarii 
ssp. blyae (Rydb.) Barneby
ssp. newberryi GrayAstragalus nudisiliquus A. Nels.Astragalus parryi GrayAstragalus phoenix BarnebyAstragalus piscator Barneby & WelshAstragalus piutensis Astragalus purshii Dougl. ex Hook.
ssp. concinnus Barneby
ssp. glareosus (Dougl.) Barneby
ssp. lagopinus (Rydb.) Barneby
ssp. lectulus (Wats.) Jones
ssp. ophiogenes (Barneby) Barneby ap. Hitchc. et al.
ssp. pumilio Barneby
ssp. purshii Dougl. ex Hook.
ssp. tinctus JonesAstragalus shortianus Nutt. ex Torr. & GrayAstragalus subvestitus (Jeps.) BarnebyAstragalus tephrodes Gray
ssp. brachylobus (Gray) Barneby
ssp. chloridae (Jones) Barneby
ssp. eurylobus Barneby
ssp. fendleri 
ssp. tephrodes GrayAstragalus tidestromii (Rydb.) ClokeyAstragalus uncialis BarnebyAstragalus utahensis (Torr.) T. & G.Astragalus waterfallii BarnebyAstragalus welshii BarnebyAstragalus zionis Jones

Section Brauntoniani (Rydb.) BarnebyAstragalus brauntonii Parish

Section Chaetodontes GrayAstragalus andersonii GrayAstragalus austinae Gray ap. Brew. & Wats.Astragalus caricinus (Jones) BarnebyAstragalus lemmoni GrayAstragalus lentiformis Gray ap. Brew. & Wats.Astragalus lyalli GrayAstragalus sepultipes (Barneby) BarnebyAstragalus spaldingii GrayAstragalus tyghensis Peck

Section Circumdati (Jones) BarnebyAstragalus circumdatus Greene

Section Cystiella BarnebyAstragalus striatiflorus Jones

Section Densifolii (Rydb.) BarnebyAstragalus curtipes GrayAstragalus nuttallii (T. & G.) J. T. How.
ssp. nuttallii (T. & G.) J. T. How.
ssp. virgatus (Gray) BarnebyAstragalus oxyphysus GrayAstragalus pomonensis JonesAstragalus pycnostachyus Gray
ssp. lanosissimus (Rydb.) Munz & McBurney ex Munz
ssp. pycnostachyus Gray

Section Desperati BarnebyAstragalus cottamii WelshAstragalus desperatus Jones
ssp. conspectus Barneby
ssp. desperatus JonesAstragalus deterior (Barneby) BarnebyAstragalus equisolensis Neese & WelshAstragalus monumentalis Barneby
ssp. cottamii (Welsh) Barneby
ssp. monumentalis BarnebyAstragalus naturitensis Pays.—Naturita milkvetch

Section Diphaci (Rydb.) L. E. JamesAstragalus diphacus Wats.

Section Diphysi GrayAstragalus iodanthus Wats.
ssp. diaphanoides Barneby
ssp. iodanthus Wats.
ssp. vipereus BarnebyAstragalus lentiginosus Dougl. ex Hook.
ssp. albiflorus Jones
ssp. albifolius Jones
ssp. ambiguus Barneby
ssp. antonius Barneby
ssp. araneosus (Sheld.) Barneby
ssp. australis Barneby
ssp. borreganus Jones
ssp. chartaceus Jones
ssp. coachellae Barneby ap. Shreve & Wiggins
ssp. diphysus (Gray) Jones
ssp. floribundus Gray
ssp. fremontii (Gray) Wats.
ssp. higginsii Welsh & Thorne
ssp. idriensis Jones
ssp. ineptus (Gray) Jones
ssp. kennedyi (Rydb.) Barneby
ssp. kernensis (Jeps.) Barneby
ssp. latus (Jones) Jones
ssp. lentiginosus Dougl. ex Hook.
ssp. macrolobus (Rydb.) Barneby
ssp. maricopae Barneby
ssp. micans Barneby
ssp. nigricalycis Jones
ssp. oropedii Barneby
ssp. palans (Jones) Jones
ssp. piscinensis Barneby
ssp. platyphyllidius (Rydb.) Peck
ssp. pohlii Welsh & Barneby
ssp. salinus (Howell) Barneby
ssp. scoppionis Jones
ssp. semotus Jeps.
ssp. sesquimetralis (Rydb.) Barneby
ssp. sierrae Jones
ssp. stramineus (Rydb.) Barneby
ssp. toyabensis Barneby
ssp. ursinus (Gray) Barneby
ssp. variabilis Barneby
ssp. vitreus Barneby
ssp. yuccanus Jones
ssp. wahweapensis Welsh
ssp. wilsonii (Greene) BarnebyAstragalus pseudiodanthus Barneby

Section Gigantei BarnebyAstragalus giganteus (Wats.)

Section GreggianiAstragalus greggii WatsonAstragalus pomphocalyx Villarreal & M. A. CarranzaAstragalus rupertii Villarreal & M. A. Carranza

Section Humillimi (Jones) BarnebyAstragalus cremnophylax Barneby
ssp. cremnophylax Barneby
ssp. hevronii Barneby
ssp. myriorrhaphis BarnebyAstragalus gilensis GreeneAstragalus humillimus A Gray ex Brand.Astragalus siliceus BarnebyAstragalus troglodytus Wats.Astragalus wittmanii Barneby

Section Hypoleuci BarnebyAstragalus hypoleucus Schau.

Section Inflati GrayAstragalus allochrous Gray
ssp. allochrous Gray
ssp. playanus Astragalus aquilonius (Barneby) BarnebyAstragalus aridus GrayAstragalus beatleyae BarnebyAstragalus cerussatus Sheld.Astragalus deanei (Rydb.) BarnebyAstragalus diaphanus Dougl. ex Hook.Astragalus douglasii (T. & G.) Gray
ssp. douglasii (T. & G.) Gray
ssp. glaberrimus Jones
ssp. parishii (Gray) Jones
ssp. perstrictus (Rydb.) Munz & McBurney ex MunzAstragalus endopterus (Barneby) BarnebyAstragalus fastidius (Kell.) JonesAstragalus geyeri Gray
ssp. geyeri Gray
ssp. triquestrus (Gray) JonesAstragalus gilmani Tidest.Astragalus gruinus BarnebyAstragalus hornii Gray
ssp. hornii Gray
ssp. minutiflorus JonesAstragalus idrietorum Barneby ap. Shreve & WigginsAstragalus insularis Kell.
ssp. harwoodii Munz & McBurney ex Munz
ssp. insularis Kell.
ssp. quentinus JonesAstragalus macrodon (H. & A.) GrayAstragalus magdalenae Greene
ssp. magdalenae Greene
ssp. niveus (Rydb.) Barneby
ssp. peirsonii (Munz & McBurney) BarnebyAstragalus moranii BarnebyAstragalus nutans JonesAstragalus oocarpus GrayAstragalus palmeri GrayAstragalus pardalinus (Rydb.) BarnebyAstragalus piscinus (Jones) Barneby ap. Shreve & WigginsAstragalus prorifer JonesAstragalus pubentissimus Torr. & Gray
ssp. peabodianus Welsh
ssp. pubentissimus Torr. & GrayAstragalus sabulonum GrayAstragalus sanctorum BarnebyAstragalus serpens JonesAstragalus sparsiflorus Gray
ssp. majusculus Gray
ssp. sparsiflorus GrayAstragalus thurberi GrayAstragalus wardi GrayAstragalus wetherilli JonesAstragalus wootoni Sheld.
ssp. candollianus (Kunth) Barneby
ssp. fendleri 
ssp. wootoni Sheld.

Section Layneani BarnebyAstragalus layneae Greene

Section Leptocarpi BarnebyAstragalus acutirostris Wats.Astragalus albens GreeneAstragalus arizonicus GrayAstragalus bernardinus JonesAstragalus breweri GrayAstragalus bryantii BarnebyAstragalus clarianus Jeps.Astragalus coahuilae JonesAstragalus emoryanus (Rydb.) Cory
ssp. emoryanus (Rydb.) Cory
ssp. terlinguensis (Cory) BarnebyAstragalus francisquitensis JonesAstragalus gentryi Standl.Astragalus hypoxylus Wats.Astragalus leptocarpus Torr. & GrayAstragalus lindheimeri Engelm. ex GrayAstragalus mohavensis Wats.
ssp. hemigyrus (Clokey) Barneby
ssp. mohavensis Wats.Astragalus nothoxys GrayAstragalus nutallianus A. DC.
ssp. austrinus (Small) Barneby ap. Shreve & Wiggins
ssp. cedrosensis Jones
ssp. imperfectus (Rydb.) Barneby
ssp. macilentus (Small) Barneby ap. B. L. Turner
ssp. micranthiformis Barneby
ssp. nuttallianus A. DC.
ssp. pleianthus (Shinners) Barneby
ssp. trichocarpus Torr. & Gray
ssp. zapatanus BarnebyAstragalus nyensis BarnebyAstragalus parvus Hemsl.Astragalus pauperculus GreeneAstragalus pringlei Wats.Astragalus rattanii Gray
ssp. jepsonianus Barneby
ssp. rattanii GrayAstragalus tener Gray
ssp. ferrisiae A. Liston
ssp. tener Gray
ssp. titi (Eastw.) BarnebyAstragalus tricarinatus Gray

Section Lotiflori GrayAstragalus lotiflorus Hook.

Section Lutosi (Rydb.) BarnebyAstragalus lutosus Jones

Section Megacarpi (Rydb.) BarnebyAstragalus beckwithii Torr. & Gray
ssp. beckwithii Torr. & Gray
ssp. purpureus Jones
ssp. sulcatus Barneby
ssp. weiserensis JonesAstragalus megacarpus (Nutt.) GrayAstragalus oophorus Wats.
ssp. caulescens (Jones) Jones
ssp. clokeyanus Barneby
ssp. lavinii Barneby
ssp. lonchocalyx Barneby
ssp. oophorus Wats.

Section Micranthi GrayAstragalus clevelandi GreeneAstragalus daleae Astragalus goldmani JonesAstragalus hartwegi Bth.Astragalus oxyrrhynchus Hemsl.Astragalus vaccarum Gray

Section Microlobium BarnebyAstragalus didymocarpus H. & A.
ssp. didymocarpus H. & A.
ssp. dispermus (Gray) Jeps.
ssp. milesianus (Rydb.) Jeps.
ssp. obispensis (Rydb.) Jeps.Astragalus gambellianus Sheld.

Section Mollissimi GrayAstragalus hartmanii Astragalus helleri FenzlAstragalus mollissimus Torr.—woolly locoweed, stemmed locoweed
ssp. bigelovii  (Gray) Barneby ap. B. L. Turner
ssp. coryi Tidest.
ssp. earlei (Greene ex Rydb.) Tidest.
ssp. irolanus (Jones) Barneby
ssp. marcidus (Greene ex Rydb.) Barneby ap. B. L. Turner
ssp. matthewsii (Wats.) Barneby
ssp. mollisimus Torr.
ssp. mongollonicus (Greene) Barneby
ssp. nitens Barneby
ssp. thompsonae (Wats.) BarnebyAstragalus nutriosensis Sanderson

Section Monoenses BarnebyAstragalus monoensis BarnebyAstragalus ravenii BarnebyAstragalus perianus BarnebyAstragalus pulsiferae Gray
ssp. pulsiferae Gray
ssp. suksdorfii (Howell) BarnebyAstragalus tiehmii Barneby

Section Panamintenses BarnebyAstragalus panamintensis Sheld. ap. Cov.

Section Platytropides BarnebyAstragalus amblytropis BarnebyAstragalus amnis-amissi Barneby ap. Hitchc. et al.Astragalus platytropis Gray

Section Pterocarpi Wats.Astragalus casei GrayAstragalus pterocarpus Wats.Astragalus tetrapterus Gray

Section Reflexi GrayAstragalus reflexus Torr. & Gray

Section Sarcocarpi GrayAstragalus bibullatus Barneby & BridgesAstragalus crassicarpus Nutt.—ground plum, buffalo plum
ssp. berlandieri Barneby
ssp. cavus Barneby
ssp. crassicarpus Nutt.
ssp. paysoni (Kelso) Barneby
ssp. trichocalyx (Nutt.) Barneby ex Gl.Astragalus gypsodes BarnebyAstragalus plattensis Nutt. ex T. & G.Astragalus sanguineus Rydb.

Section Scaposi (Rydb.) BarnebyAstragalus calycosus Torr. ex Wats.
ssp. calycosus Torr. ex Wats.
ssp. mancus (Rydb.) Barneby
ssp. monophyllidius (Rydb.) Barneby
ssp. scaposus (Gray) Jones

Section Scutanei BarnebyAstragalus brazoensis Buckl.Astragalus scutaneus Barneby

Section Succumbentes GrayAstragalus succumbens Dougl. ex Hook.

Section Tennesseensis BarnebyAstragalus tennesseensis Gray ap. Chapman

Section Trichopodi (Rydb.) BarnebyAstragalus asymmetricus Sheld.Astragalus oxyphysopsis BarnebyAstragalus trichopodus (Nutt.) Gray
ssp. lonchus (Jones) Barneby
ssp. phoxus (Jones) Barneby
ssp. trichopodus (Nutt.) Gray

Section Villosi BarnebyAstragalus distortus Torr. & Gray
ssp. distortus Torr. & Gray
ssp. engelmanni (Sheld.) JonesAstragalus obcordatus Ell.Astragalus soxmaniorum LundellAstragalus villosus Michx.

Trimeniaeus Phalanx Barneby

Section Sesamei DC.Astragalus wrightii Gray

Incertae SedisAstragalus peristereus Boiss. & Hausskn.

South American AstragalusAstragalus alienus GrayAstragalus amatus ClosAstragalus ameghinoi SpegazziniAstragalus anni-novi BurkartAstragalus arequipensis VogelAstragalus argentinus ManganaroAstragalus arnottianus (Gillies) ReicheAstragalus asplundii JohnstonAstragalus austroargentinus Gómez-SosaAstragalus bellus (Kuntze) FriesAstragalus bergii HieronymusAstragalus berteri CollaAstragalus berterianus (Moris) ReicheAstragalus boelckei Gómez-SosaAstragalus bonariensis Gómez-SosaAstragalus brackenridgei GrayAstragalus brevidentatus WrightAstragalus burkartii JohnstonAstragalus bustillosii ClosAstragalus cachinalensis PhilippiAstragalus carinatus (H. & A.) ReicheAstragalus chamissonis (Vogel) ReicheAstragalus chubutensis SpegazziniAstragalus colhuensis Gómez-SosaAstragalus complicatus Gillies ex Hooker & ArnottAstragalus confinis JohnstonAstragalus coquimbensis (H. & A.) ReicheAstragalus cracca DC.Astragalus cruckshanksii (H. & A.) GrisebachAstragalus crymophilus JohnstonAstragalus cryptanthus WeddellAstragalus crypticus JohnstonAstragalus cryptobotrys JohnstonAstragalus curvicaulis (Clos) ReicheAstragalus cuyanus Gómez-SosaAstragalus darumbium (Bertero) ClosAstragalus deminutivus JohnstonAstragalus dielsii MacbrideAstragalus dillinghami MacbrideAstragalus distinens MacloskieAstragalus dodti PhilippiAstragalus domeykoanus (Phil.) ReicheAstragalus edmonstonei (Hook.) RobinsonAstragalus fabrisii Gómez-SosaAstragalus famatinae JohnstonAstragalus flavocreatus JohnstonAstragalus garbancillo CavanillesAstragalus geminiflorus Humb. & Bonpl.Astragalus germaini PhilippiAstragalus gruinus BarnebyAstragalus hickenii Gómez-SosaAstragalus hypoglottis L.—field milkvetch, purple milkvetch, cock's-head
ssp. gremlii Astragalus hypsogenus JohnstonAstragalus illinii JohnstonAstragalus joergensenii JohnstonAstragalus johnstonii Gómez-SosaAstragalus limariensis MuñozAstragalus looserii JohnstonAstragalus macrocarpus (Phil.) ReicheAstragalus magellanicus Gómez-SosaAstragalus maulensis SpegazziniAstragalus micranthellus WeddellAstragalus minimus VogelAstragalus minutissimus WeddellAstragalus monteroi JohnstonAstragalus monticola PhilippiAstragalus moyanoi SpegazziniAstragalus nelidae Gómez-SosaAstragalus neobarnebyanus Gómez-SosaAstragalus neoburkartianus Gómez-SosaAstragalus neocarpus Gómez-SosaAstragalus neuquenensis Gómez-SosaAstragalus nicorae Gómez-SosaAstragalus nivicola Gómez-SosaAstragalus nudus ClosAstragalus orthocarpus JohnstonAstragalus palenae (Phil.) Reiche
var. palenae Astragalus paposanus JohnstonAstragalus parodii JohnstonAstragalus patagonicus (Phil.) SpegazziniAstragalus pauranthus JohnstonAstragalus pehuenches NiederleinAstragalus peruvianus VogelAstragalus pickeringii GrayAstragalus pissisi (Phil.) JohnstonAstragalus pulviniformis JohnstonAstragalus punae JohnstonAstragalus pusillus VogelAstragalus richii GrayAstragalus romasanus UlbrichAstragalus ruiz-lealii JohnstonAstragalus sanctae-crucis SpegazziniAstragalus spegazzinii JohnstonAstragalus sprucei JohnstonAstragalus tarijensis WeddellAstragalus tehuelches SpegazziniAstragalus triflorus (DC.) GrayAstragalus uniflorus DC.Astragalus urbanianus UlbrichAstragalus vagus (Clos) ReicheAstragalus valerianensis JohnstonAstragalus valparadisiensis SpegazziniAstragalus venturii JohnstonAstragalus verticillatus (Phil.) ReicheAstragalus vesiculosus ClosAstragalus weberbaueri UlbrichAstragalus weddellianus (Kuntze) JohnstonAstragalus werdermanni'' Johnston

See also
 List of the largest genera of flowering plants
 List of species of Astragalus (in Russian)

References

External links
 ILDIS species list for Astragalus
 A large species list for Astragalus
 The Plant List species list for Astragalus
 USDA species list for Astragalus

 World checklist of Astragalus species from the Catalogue of Life, 2,997 species supplied by M. Hassler’s World Plants.

Astragalus